Xingyi may refer to:

Xing Yi Quan, one of the major internal Chinese martial arts
The Oath (Singaporean TV series), a 2011 TV series

Places in China
Xingyi, Guizhou, a county-level city in Guizhou
Xingyi, Chongqing (兴义), a town in Fengdu County, Chongqing
Xingyi, Hebei (邢邑), a town in Dingzhou, Hebei
Xingyi, Sichuan (兴义), a town in Xinjin County, Sichuan